Made is a 2001 American crime comedy film written, directed and co-produced by Jon Favreau. It stars Favreau, Vince Vaughn, Peter Falk, and Sean Combs. It was both Favreau's feature directorial debut and Combs’ acting debut.

Plot
Bobby has ties to the local mafia boss, Max, but works as an honest mason for Max's construction projects. He fights in amateur boxing matches on the side, but his career is lackluster (five wins, five losses, one draw). Struggling to support his stripper girlfriend Jessica and her daughter Chloe, Bobby decides to do a mafia job for Max. Against his better judgment, he brings along his ne'er-do-well friend Ricky.

Bobby and Ricky go to New York to act as Max's representatives for a money laundering deal with his East Coast partner, Ruiz. They meet Jimmy, who will be their driver, and Horrace, who is connected to both Max and Ruiz. Ricky and Bobby squabble throughout their trip as Ricky tries to live large while Bobby wants to stay cautious and stick to the letter of Max's instructions. Ruiz has a low opinion of the pair, but sends them off to show his criminal contact, the Welshman, a good time. Gaffing several times along the way, the pair eventually manage to arrange a deal between Ruiz and the Welshman's Westie contacts.

Ricky grows suspicious of Ruiz, and insists that they bring a gun to their meeting with the Westies. Bobby adamantly refuses. On the day of the meet, Ricky has disappeared, but Jimmy insists that Bobby carry on with the meeting. As Bobby begins to grow suspicious of Jimmy, he meets with the Welshman and the Westies. The Westies double-cross Bobby and the Welshman, but Ricky arrives from a side entrance with a gun. A Westie recognizes Ricky's weapon as a starter pistol and a fight breaks out. Jimmy arrives with a real pistol and sends the boys away while he deals with the Westies.

Back in Los Angeles, Bobby severs all business ties with Max. Arriving home, he discovers Jessica in bed with a client and snorting cocaine. Bobby tries to convince Jessica to clean up her act for Chloe's sake, but Jessica refuses. Instead, she asks that Bobby take custody of Chloe and leave. In an epilogue set at Chuck E. Cheese's, we learn that Bobby and Ricky are now raising Chloe together, although the two friends still bicker constantly.

Cast

Movie connections
Because the film is written by Jon Favreau and stars Favreau and Vince Vaughn, it is commonly misinterpreted as a sequel to Swingers. The license plate of Jimmy's Limo, "DBLDN11," is a reference to a blackjack strategy articulated in Swingers that one should "always double down on an 11." 

During Dustin Diamond's cameo, Ricky refers to him as "Screech," referencing Diamond's character on Saved By the Bell.

Reception
The critical reception of the film was positive, receiving a 71% "Fresh" rating at Rotten Tomatoes based on 106 reviews, with an average score of 6.3/10. The site's consensus reads "Not as good as Swingers, but it's still witty and goofy enough for some laughs." The film received a limited release in the United States and had almost no release overseas. It had a world box office gross of $5.4 million.

References

External links
 
 

2001 films
American crime comedy-drama films
2000s English-language films
Lionsgate films
2000s crime comedy-drama films
Artisan Entertainment films
Films directed by Jon Favreau
Films produced by Jon Favreau
Films scored by Lyle Workman
2001 directorial debut films
2001 independent films
2001 comedy films
2001 drama films
2000s American films